Tripteroides (Rachionotomyia) aranoides is a species of zoophilic mosquito belonging to the genus Tripteroides. It is found in India, Sri Lanka Bangladesh, Cambodia, China, Indonesia, Laos, Malaysia, Myanmar, Nepal, Singapore, Taiwan, Thailand, and Vietnam.

References

External links
Laboratory bionomics of Tripteroides aranoides.
Genus Tripteroides

aranoides